Summer 1993 is a 2017 Catalan-language Spanish drama film directed and written by Carla Simón. The film premiered in the Generation section at the 67th Berlin International Film Festival, where it won the GWFF Best First Feature Award. It was selected as the Spanish entry for the Best Foreign Language Film at the 90th Academy Awards, but it was not nominated.

Plot
In 1993, after her parents die of AIDS, a six-year-old orphaned girl goes to live with her uncle and his family.

Cast
 Laia Artigas as Frida
 Paula Blanco as Cesca
 Etna Campillo as Irene
 Bruna Cusí as Marga
 Jordi Figueras as Blai
 David Verdaguer as Esteve

Reception
On review aggregator website Rotten Tomatoes, the film holds an approval rating of 100% based on 88 reviews, and an average rating of 8.08/10. The website's critical consensus reads, "Summer 1993 (Estiu 1993) finds writer-director Carla Simón drawing on personal memories to create a thoughtful drama elevated by outstanding work from its young leads." On Metacritic, the film has a weighted average score of 81 out of 100, based on 18 critics, indicating "universal acclaim"; it is listed as a "Metacritic must-see".

See also
 List of submissions to the 90th Academy Awards for Best Foreign Language Film
 List of Spanish submissions for the Academy Award for Best Foreign Language Film

References

External links
 

2017 films
2017 drama films
Catalan films
Films set in 1993
Spanish drama films
2010s Catalan-language films
Spanish biographical films
Avalon films
2010s Spanish films
Silver Bear Grand Jury Prize winners